Musawenkosi Nkomonde is a South African naval officer, currently serving as Flag Officer Fleet.

Background
He joined the Navy in 1997 after school. After military training he attended the South African Military Academy where he earned a BSc degree.

He then completed combat training before joining SAS Fleur as a gunnery officer and later navigation officer. He joined SAS Umzimkulu as a navigation officer before attending International Mine Warfare Course for Commanders in HMS Collingwood in 2004.

He was appointed Officer Commanding of SAS Umkomaas  in September 2007 and of the frigate SAS Isandlwana in June 2011. On 1 April 2017 he was appointed Inspector General of the Navy and promoted to Rear Admiral. He was appointed Flag Officer Fleet on 1 June 2020.

References

South African admirals
People from Soweto
Living people
Year of birth missing (living people)